Gabriel Reymond (born 15 April 1923) is a Swiss former racewalker who competed in the 1952 Summer Olympics and in the 1960 Summer Olympics. As of 2013 he lives in Renens, Switzerland.

References

1923 births
Living people
Swiss male racewalkers
Olympic athletes of Switzerland
Athletes (track and field) at the 1952 Summer Olympics
Athletes (track and field) at the 1960 Summer Olympics